The Benxi mine is a large iron mine located in north-eastern China in the Liaoning. Benxi represents one of the largest iron ore reserves in China and in the world having estimated reserves of 3 billion tonnes of ore grading 43.5% iron metal.

References 

Iron mines in China